Martina Kořenová ( Holoubková, born 26 April 1975) is a Czech chess player who holds the FIDE title of Woman International Master (WIM, 1993).

Biography
In the first half of the 1990s, Kořenová was one of the Czech leading female chess players. In 1992, she won silver medal in Czechoslovak Women's Chess Championship. In 1993, in Tišnov she won silver medal in Czech Women's Chess Championship. In 1993, Martina Kořenová participated in Women's World Chess Championship Interzonal Tournament in Jakarta where ranked 38th place.

She played for Czech Republic in the Women's Chess Olympiad:
 In 1994, at first board in the 31st Chess Olympiad (women) in Moscow (+6, =3, -3).

Kořenová played for Czech Republic in the European Team Chess Championship:
 In 1992, at first reserve board in the 1st European Team Chess Championship (women) in Debrecen (+2, =2, -0).

In 1993, she awarded the FIDE Woman International Master (WIM) title.

Personal life
In 1999, she married , who is a Czech presenter, science communicator and local politician. They have 2 daughters and 2 sons.

References

External links
 
 
 

1975 births
Living people
Czech female chess players
Czechoslovak female chess players
Chess Woman International Masters
Chess Olympiad competitors